Al-Seeb Stadium is a multi-use stadium in Seeb, Oman.  It is currently used mostly for football matches and is the home stadium of Al-Seeb Club.  The stadium has a capacity of 14,000 people.

Both the Oman and Syria National football teams used Seeb Stadium as one of their home grounds for their 2018 FIFA World Cup qualifying matches.

References

Football venues in Oman
Sports venues in Oman